A Regular Fellow is a 1925 American silent comedy film directed by A. Edward Sutherland and written by Joseph A. Mitchell, Reggie Morris and Keene Thompson. The film stars Raymond Griffith, Mary Brian, Tyrone Power, Sr., Edgar Norton, Nigel De Brulier, Gustav von Seyffertitz, and Kathleen Kirkham. The film was released on October 5, 1925, by Paramount Pictures.

The film had a working title of He's A Prince.

Plot
As described in a film magazine review, the Prince, weary of his job, tries to quit, but the King will not allow it. He meets and falls in love with a tourist Girl, but he is commanded to marry a Princess from a neighboring kingdom, who is in love with a guardsman. By a happy turn of events, the King is dethroned; the Prince is made president of the newly created republic, and he marries the Girl.

Cast

Preservation
With no prints of A Regular Fellow located in any film archives, it is a lost film.

References

External links

Stills and lobby cards at silentfilmstillarchive.com

1925 films
1920s English-language films
Silent American comedy films
1925 comedy films
Paramount Pictures films
Films directed by A. Edward Sutherland
Films set in Europe
American black-and-white films
Lost American films
American silent feature films
1925 lost films
Lost comedy films
1920s American films